Lady Elizabeth is the name of two ships:

 , an iron and timber barque wrecked off Rottnest Island in 1878
 , an iron barque which was damaged off Cape Horn in 1913 and sunk at the Falkland Islands in 1936

Ship names